The following lists events that happened during 1979 in Zaire.

Incumbents 
 President: Mobutu Sese Seko
 Prime Minister: Mpinga Kasenda – André Bo-Boliko Lokonga

Events

See also

 Zaire
 History of the Democratic Republic of the Congo

References

Sources

 
Years of the 20th century in Zaire
Zaire
Zaire